The N.F.-Board was a federation of football associations established on 12 December 2003. It was made up of teams that represent nations, dependencies, unrecognized states, minorities, stateless peoples, regions and micronations not affiliated to FIFA.

One of the founders was Luc Misson, a lawyer who represented Belgian footballer Jean-Marc Bosman in a case that led to the Bosman ruling.

VIVA World Cup
N.F.-Board organized five VIVA World Cups, including  the inaugural games in November 2006. The events were as follows:
2006 Viva World Cup in Occitania
2008 Viva World Cup in Sápmi
2009 Viva World Cup in Padania
2010 Viva World Cup in Gozo
2012 Viva World Cup in Kurdistan

Since 2013, Non-FIFA international football is managed by the Confederation of Independent Football Associations (CONIFA).

Former members of the NF-Board

The teams in bold competed in at least one Viva World Cup.

See also

 Non-FIFA international football
 Confederation of Independent Football Associations

Footnotes

 
Association football governing bodies